Athelocystis is a genus of fungi in the family Atheliaceae. The genus is monotypic, containing the single species Athelocystis capitata, found in Brazil.

References

Atheliales
Monotypic Basidiomycota genera
Fungi of Brazil
Taxa named by Leif Ryvarden
Taxa described in 2010